Prituľany is a village and municipality in Humenné District in the Prešov Region of north-east Slovakia.

History
In historical records the village was first mentioned in 1454.

Geography
The municipality lies at an altitude of 242metres and covers an area of 6.482 km2.
It has a population of about 65 people.

References

External links
http://www.statistics.sk/mosmis/eng/run.html

Villages and municipalities in Humenné District
Zemplín (region)